The 1998 WAFU Club Championship was the 29th  football club tournament season that took place for the runners-up or third place of each West African country's domestic league, the West African Club Championship. It was won by Nigeria's Shooting Stars after defeating Niger's JS Ténéré 2–0. Only four clubs competed in the edition. All of its four matches were played in Lomé, Togo.

The edition would start at the semis and only have a single match each of the four portions and a third place match would occur in the season.

Semifinals

|}

3rd place match

|}

Final

|}

Winners

See also
1998 CAF Champions League
1998 CAF Cup Winners' Cup
1998 CAF Cup

References

External links
Full results of the 1998 WAFU Club Championship at RSSSF

West African Club Championship
1998 in African football